UDP-2-acetamido-2-deoxy-ribo-hexuluronate aminotransferase (WbpE, WlbC) is an enzyme with systematic name UDP-2-acetamido-3-amino-2,3-dideoxy-alpha-D-glucuronate:2-oxoglutarate aminotransferase. This enzyme catalyses the following chemical reaction

 UDP-2-acetamido-3-amino-2,3-dideoxy-alpha-D-glucuronate + 2-oxoglutarate  UDP-2-acetamido-2-deoxy-alpha-D-ribo-hex-3-uluronate + L-glutamate

This enzyme is a pyridoxal 5'-phosphate protein.

References

External links 
 

EC 2.6.1